Klaasje Ietje "Alieke" Meijer (born 2 March 1995) is a Dutch singer, actress and flautist. Meijer rose to fame as one of the members of the Belgian-Dutch girl group K3, where she sang from 2015 until 2021, replacing Josje Huisman. In 2022, Meijer won the SBS6 reality game show The Big Balance.

Early life
Meijer was born in the village of Lutjegast in Groningen as the eldest child of a Dutch reformed vicar and a music teacher. She was named after her maternal grandmother, but acquired the nickname Alieke. Throughout her childhood and college time, she was known by family and friends as Alieke Meijer. As a child, she frequently moved across the country as a result of her father's profession. The family initially lived in Nieuwendijk in Noord-Brabant, but moved to 's-Gravenzande, where she completed her VWO certificate. She applied to the Conservatorium van Amsterdam, where she started studying classical music and flute, but later quit her studies.

Career

Early career
During her childhood, Meijer alongside her mother and younger sisters performed in a group together known locally as the Meijer Quintet. They performed at weddings and anniversaries. At the age of 16, she was featured on the Zapp programme Kinderen voor Kinderen Klinkklaar as a singer-songwriter because she had made a cover of the choir's song "Meidengroep". As a flautist at the Conservatorium van Amsterdam, she performed a composition of a twelve-year-old composer that later won the audience and first prize in the Prinses Christina Concours in 2015.

K3 Zoekt K3 and time in K3

In early 2015, Meijer auditioned for K3 Zoekt K3, a television talent show that sought to replace Karen Damen, Kristel Verbeke and Josje Huisman as the outgoing members of the Belgian-Dutch girl group K3. She used her first name "Klaasje" instead of "Alieke" while applying. During the televised audition, Meijer sang the group's 2001 single "Je hebt een vriend" and managed to persuade the audience and jury to progress to the next round. Meijer was an early favourite during the show's run, partially caused by her name and back story being coincidentally similar to the existing K3 members. De Telegraaf profiled her as someone that had tactfully tried to pose herself as a copy of blonde Dutch member Josje Huisman. Meijer eventually made it to the first live show where she progressed directly to the second show after her trio with Marthe De Pillecyn and Lauren De Ruyck won the televoting in the first round. During the second live show, she progressed after the second round after being saved by the jury. She progressed directly from the semi-final to the final after her duet with Lauren De Ruyck received the most votes. In the final of 6 November 2015, she beat her fellow Dutch counterpart Jindra van Schaik into becoming the new blonde member of the group. With red-haired member Hanne Verbruggen and black-haired Marthe De Pillecyn, Meijer completed the new line-up of K3.

With K3, Meijer released the single and album 10.000 luchtballonnen, which became one of the group's most successful records at the time. In 2016, the group won Radio 2 Zomerhit for their single "Ushaia". Meijer debuted as a television presenter on Iedereen K3 that same year. Meijer debuted as an actress in the group's first new motion picture K3 Love Cruise, which was released in December 2017. She starred in a second television series with the group, K3 Roller Disco, in 2018 and in a second film, Dans van de Farao, in 2020. During her time in K3, Meijer served several seasons as a coach on the Flemish version of The Voice Kids. 

On 9 February 2021, Gert Verhulst and K3 announced during a press conference that Meijer had decided to leave the group. She later also stated that she had grown out of her role in K3 as a person and that she wanted to start an "adult life". Her departure lead to criticism as it was the second time in the group's history that the blonde member decided to go solo after Kathleen Aerts decided to leave the group in 2009. Meijer was eventually replaced by Julia Boschman, who had won K2 Zoekt K3, a television show to find a replacement for Meijer.

Solo career
Meijer appeared in De Slimste Mens Ter Wereld in 2021, but was eliminated after one episode. She subsequently took part in the SBS6 reality game show The Big Balance, in which celebrities challenge each other on slacklining, with the main challenge in the final to slackline across the Johan Cruijff Arena. Meijer won the final of the show on New Year's Day in 2022, being the only celeb to be able to fully cross the stadium. 

In 2022, she was the Scorpion on the second season of The Masked Singer in Flanders. Meijer debuted as Jitske in her first solo acting role in the film Boeien!. She performed a Grease medley at the Kinderprinsengrachtconcert in August 2022.

Personal life
Meijer moved to Rotterdam in 2020.

References

1995 births
Dutch pop singers
People from Groningen (province)
Living people
21st-century Dutch women singers
21st-century Dutch singers
21st-century Dutch actresses